Ian Rankin (born 1960) is a Scottish crime author.

Ian Rankin may also refer to

 Ian Rankin (footballer) (born 1979), Scottish footballer
 Iain Rankin (politician) (born 1983), Canadian politician 
 Ian Rankin (rugby union), Scottish rugby union coach
 Ian Niall Rankin (1932–2020), 4th Baronet

See also
 Rankin (name)